Peter Moore (born 11 January 1957) is a former Australian rules footballer who played for Collingwood and Melbourne in the Victorian Football League (VFL).

Early life and education
As a student at Eltham High School, Moore excelled in both academic and sporting events. He played for the Eltham Football Club before being selected to play for Collingwood.

Sporting career
A tall, agile ruckman with good ball skills, Moore is one of only five men to have won Brownlow Medals at different clubs; with Collingwood in 1979 and with Melbourne in 1984.

Winner of the Copeland Trophy in 1979 and 1980 and captain of Collingwood from 1981 to 1982, Moore was inducted into the Collingwood Hall of Fame before being transferred to the Melbourne Football Club.

Recurring hamstring injuries saw Moore's form drop off in his final seasons with Collingwood before being recruited by Melbourne, where his career took on a resurgence.

Moore played a total of 249 matches and was unlucky not to play in a premiership side considering he played in the Magpies' losing Grand Final teams of 1977, 1979, 1980 and 1981.

At the 1979 Perth State of Origin Carnival he was named in the All-Australian team.

After his VFL career finished, he coached Eltham Football Club, where he began his career, to a premiership in the second division of the Diamond Valley Football League in 1989.

In 2005, Moore was inducted into the Australian Football Hall of Fame.

When Collingwood lost the 1981 Grand Final to Carlton, the players were presented with runners-up medallions on the dais. Moore infamously threw his away in the background after receiving it.

External links
Melbourne FC – History
Australian Football Hall of Fame
Demon Wiki profile

1957 births
Living people
Collingwood Football Club players
Melbourne Football Club players
Brownlow Medal winners
Copeland Trophy winners
Australian Football Hall of Fame inductees
All-Australians (1953–1988)
Victorian State of Origin players
Australian rules footballers from Victoria (Australia)
Eltham Football Club players
Eltham Football Club coaches
Monash Law School alumni
People from Eltham, Victoria